33rd Al-Mahdi Division (named after the twelfth Shia Imam, Al-Mahdi) was a brigade of the Islamic Revolutionary Guard Corps. It was established on 24 February 1982 before Operation Fath ol-Mobin in the Iran–Iraq War, with Ali Fazli as its commander. It was part of the 7th Fajr Division for some time during the war. After Operation Beit ol-Moqaddas, there was some reform in the structure of the brigade, and Mohammad Jaafar Asadi was made as the commander, and remained the commander of the unit until the end of the war. On 24 April 1983 the brigade was separated from the 19th Fajr Division and became part of the newly founded 7th Corps. The brigade was turned into the 33rd Al-Mahdi Division after the successful Operation Dawn 8.

After Iraqi's adoption of new defensive tactics in 1986, Iran begin creating new "Qaem" units, and the independent 326th Qaem Unit of Fars was founded on 25 May 1986 under command of Abdol-Ali Najafi, which were consisted of forces from the 33rd Division. It was stationed in Haj Omran area in the Shahid Sadr Highlands. It also participated in Operation Karbala-2. It was later merged with the Al-Mahdi Division.

After the Iran-Iraq war, Al-Mahdi Division was separated into two units: 33rd Al-Mahdi Airborne Brigade under command of Hojjatollah Azarpeykan, stationed in Jahrom County, Fars Province; and 3rd Ansar-ol-Hojjat Brigade, as part of 19th Fajr Division, under command of Abdol-Ali Najafi stationed in Fasa County, Fars Province. 33rd Al-Mahdi Airborne Brigade has been active in Iran–PJAK conflict.

References

Military units and formations of Army of the Guardians of the Islamic Revolution
Airborne units and formations of Iran